Moneydance is a personal finance software application developed by The Infinite Kind, formerly developed by Reilly Technologies, USA. Written in Java, it can be run on many different computers and operating systems.  Under the hood, Moneydance implements a double-entry bookkeeping system, but the user interface is geared towards non-accountants.

Moneydance implements the OFX protocol to perform online banking and bill payment.  Other features include check printing, graphing and reporting, scheduled transaction reminders, transaction tags, VAT/GST tracking, budget management and tracking, file encryption, and investment portfolio management.

Moneydance has been localized into French, German, UK English, Norwegian, Greek (partially), Spanish, Portuguese and Italian. UK supermarket Tesco's "Personal Finance" software is based on Moneydance.

An open application programming interface (API) is also available, allowing people to write extensions to the program.

The application is scriptable in jython.

Releases
 Moneydance 2008
 Moneydance 2010
 Moneydance 2011
 Moneydance 2012
 Moneydance 2012.2
 Moneydance 2012.5
 Moneydance 2014 
 Moneydance 2015 
 Moneydance 2015.2
 Moneydance 2015.3
 Moneydance 2015.4
 Moneydance 2015.6
 Moneydance 2015.7
 Moneydance 2017
 Moneydance 2017.2
 Moneydance 2017.3
 Moneydance 2017.5
 Moneydance 2019
 Moneydance 2019.1
 Moneydance 2021
 Moneydance 2021
 Moneydance 2022
 Moneydance 2022.2

See also 
 List of personal finance software

References

External links 
 2007 MacWorld Review

Accounting software
Accounting software for Linux
Java (programming language) software